The North Side Historic District is a Registered Historic District in Peoria, Illinois, United States. The district is located on a terrace at the bank of the Illinois River and is predominantly residential. The district was added to the National Register of Historic Places on November 21, 1983.  Due to the growth of the city in the 20th century, this original North Side is now in the southeastern quadrant of the city.

There are 213 contributing properties listed on the registration.  Among them are:
 the Scottish Rite Cathedral at 400 NE Perry Ave.;
 the Peoria Diocese buildings of the former high schools Spalding Institute and Academy of Our Lady, and adjacent offices and convent in the 400 NE block of Madison St. and 400/500 blocks of Bryan St.;
 American Legion Post #2 at 406 NE Monroe St. (torn down by the Diocese in the late 2000s); and
 St. Mary's Cathedral and its diocesan chancery at 607 NE Madison St.

Location
The old part of the city of Peoria is built on a series of two terraces. The lower terrace slopes up from the Illinois River bank to a height of 83 feet where it meets the base of the second terrace. The width of the initial terrace varies from  miles to 1 miles. The second terrace encompasses a series of bluffs which rise from 75 to 100 feet above the first terrace. The North Side Historic District is located on the initial terrace, to the north of the city's central business district and is primarily residential in nature.

Boundaries
The North Side Historic District is roughly bounded by three Peoria city streets: NE Perry, NE Madison, and Fayette Streets.

Notes

Neighborhoods in Illinois
Historic districts on the National Register of Historic Places in Illinois
Peoria, Illinois
National Register of Historic Places in Peoria County, Illinois